Elizabeth Shilin Spelke FBA (born May 28, 1949) is an American cognitive psychologist at the Department of Psychology of Harvard University and director of the Laboratory for Developmental Studies.

Starting in the 1980s, she carried out experiments on infants and young children to test their cognitive faculties. She has suggested that human beings have a large array of innate mental abilities. In recent years, she has made important contributions to the debate on cognitive differences between men and women. She defends the position that there is no scientific evidence of any significant disparity in the intellectual faculties of males and females.

Education and career
Spelke did her undergraduate studies at Radcliffe College with the child psychologist Jerome Kagan. Her thesis studied attachment and emotional reactions in babies. She realized that she needed to have an idea of what babies really understood, and so began her lifelong interest in the cognitive aspect of child psychology.

She did her Ph.D. at Cornell with developmental psychologist Eleanor Gibson, from whom she learned how to design experiments on young children.

Her first academic post was at the University of Pennsylvania, where she worked for nine years. Thereafter she moved first to Cornell, and then to MIT's Department of Brain and Cognitive Sciences. She has been a professor at Harvard since 2001.

Spelke was elected a Fellow of the American Academy of Arts and Sciences in 1997. She was the recipient of the 2009 Jean Nicod Prize and delivered a series of lectures in Paris hosted by the French National Centre for Scientific Research. She was elected as a Corresponding Fellow of the British Academy in 2015. In 2016 Spelke won the C.L. de Carvalho-Heineken Prize for Cognitive Sciences. Spelke was honored several times with the Honoris Causa degree in France, Netherlands, Sweden, and Uruguay.

Experiments
The kind of experiments carried out at the Laboratory of Developmental Studies try to infer the cognitive abilities of babies by using the method of preferential looking, developed by Robert Fantz. This consists of presenting babies with different images and deducing which one is more appealing to them by the length of time their attention fixes on them.

For example, researchers may repeatedly show a baby an image with a certain number of objects. Once the baby is habituated, they present a second image with more or fewer objects. If the baby looks at the new image for a longer time, the researchers may infer that the baby can distinguish different quantities.

Through an array of similar experiments, Spelke interpreted her evidence to suggest that babies have a set of highly sophisticated, innate mental skills. This provides an alternative to the hypothesis originated by William James that babies are born with no distinctive cognitive abilities but acquire them all through education and experience (see Principles of Psychology, 1890).

The debate on sex and intelligence

In 2005, Lawrence Summers, then Harvard president, speculated over the preponderance of men over women in high-end science and engineering positions. He surmised that a statistical difference in the variance of innate abilities among male and female populations (male variance tends to be higher, resulting in more extremes) could play a role. His words immediately sparked a heated debate. Spelke was among the strongest critics of Summers, and in April 2005, she faced Steven Pinker in an open debate over the issue. She declared that her own experiments revealed no difference between the mental capacities of male and female children ranging in age from 5 months to 7 years old.

References

External links
Harvard faculty profile of Spelke
Spelke lab website
New York Times profile of Spelke
Edge.org profile of Spelke
Video (and audio) of conversation discussing some of her research with Spelke and Joshua Knobe on Bloggingheads.tv
Margaret Talbot, The baby lab, ''The New Yorker, Sep. 4, 2006. https://web.archive.org/web/20090122052520/http://www.newamerica.net/publications/articles/2006/the_baby_lab

21st-century American psychologists
American women psychologists
Women cognitive scientists
American developmental psychologists
Cognitive development researchers
Fellows of the Society of Experimental Psychologists
Fellows of the American Academy of Arts and Sciences
Fellows of the American Association for the Advancement of Science
Jean Nicod Prize laureates
Members of the United States National Academy of Sciences
Winners of the Heineken Prize
Cornell University alumni
Radcliffe College alumni
Harvard University faculty
1949 births
Living people
Fellows of the Cognitive Science Society
Corresponding Fellows of the British Academy
American women academics
21st-century American women
20th-century American psychologists